Cotinus, the 
smoketree or smoke bush, is a genus of seven species of flowering plants in the family Anacardiaceae, closely related to the sumacs (Rhus).

Characteristics
They are large shrubs or small trees, native to the warm temperate Northern Hemisphere. The leaves are deciduous, alternate, simple oval shape, 3–13 cm long. The flowers are clustered in a large open terminal panicles 15–30 cm long with a fluffy grayish-buff appearance resembling a cloud of smoke over the plant, from which the name derives. The fruit is a small drupe with a single seed. Often classified in Rhus in the past, they are distinguished by the leaves being simple (not pinnate) and the 'smoke-like' fluffy flower heads.

Growth
The American smoketree (Cotinus obovatus, syn. Rhus cotinoides) is native to the southeastern United States, from Tennessee south to Alabama and west to Oklahoma and eastern Texas. It is a larger plant, frequently becoming a small tree between 3 and 5 meters (10 to 15 feet) tall, with a trunk from 20 to 35 centimeters (8 to 14 inches) in diameter. The leaves are also larger, 6–13 cm long; it also has varied but very bright fall color, usually brighter than the Eurasian species. The foliage is described to be a red wine-like, and the shrub has deep pink flowers in the summer. The flower heads are usually sparser than in C. coggygria.

Cultivation and uses
The smoke trees, particularly C. coggygria, are popular garden shrubs. Several bronze or purple-leaved cultivars of C. coggygria have been selected, with warm pink inflorescences set against purple-black foliage; the most common in commerce are 'Notcutt's Variety' and 'Royal Purple'. When brought into cultivation together, the two species will form hybrids; some garden cultivars are of this parentage.

Cultivation is best in dry, infertile soils, which keeps the growth habit more compact and also improves the autumn colour; when planted in fertile soil, they become large, coarse and also tend to be short-lived, succumbing to verticillium wilt disease. They can be coppiced in early spring, to produce first-year shoots up to 2 m tall with large handsome leaves, but no "smoke".

Gallery

References

External links 

 Tree Guide - Smoke Tree
 Tree Topics - Smoke Tree
 Smoke Tree
Cotinus obovatus images at bioimages.vanderbilt.edu

Anacardiaceae
Anacardiaceae genera
Taxa named by Philip Miller